António Martins may refer to:

 António Martins (footballer) (1913–?), Portuguese footballer
 António Martins (sport shooter, born 1892) (1892–1930), Portuguese Olympic sports shooter
 António Martins (sport shooter, born 1930), Portuguese Olympic sports shooter and son of the above

See also
 Antônio Martins, a municipality in Rio Grande do Norte, Brazil